Robert Sura Jr. (born March 25, 1973) is an American former professional basketball player who played ten seasons for five different teams in the National Basketball Association (NBA).

Early life and college career
Born in Wilkes-Barre, Pennsylvania, Robert Sura played in high school at G.A.R. Memorial. He had a high game of 69 while leading G.A.R. to a streak of 86 consecutive league victories.

After high school, Sura played basketball for Florida State University, playing on the same team as fellow NBA players Charlie Ward and Sam Cassell.  Sura holds the all-time scoring record at Florida State with 2,130 points.

Sura was named the ACC Rookie of the Year his freshman year at Florida State (1991–92).

NBA career

Sura was drafted 17th overall by the Cleveland Cavaliers in the 1995 NBA Draft. His best season with the Cavaliers was his last, as he averaged 13.8 points per game during the 1999-2000 season. He was then traded to the Golden State Warriors, and has also played for the Detroit Pistons, Atlanta Hawks and Houston Rockets.

With the Hawks, he gained attention by almost posting three straight triple-double games—the third was subsequently taken away from him by the league when he purposely missed a layup to get his 10th rebound. The NBA defines a field goal attempt as attempting to put the basketball in the basket for a field goal. Since he had no intention to put the basketball in the basket, he could not be credited with a rebound.

Sura competed in the 3-point tournament during All-Star Weekend as well as the Slam Dunk competition.

Sura is the all-time leading scorer at Florida State, which retired his jersey in 2007.

Throughout the 2005-06 NBA season and 2006-07 NBA season Sura was on injured reserve.

On October 29, 2007, Sura was cut by the Rockets.

Sura has appeared in the PokerStars series The Big Game.

References

External links
 

1973 births
Living people
American men's basketball players
Atlanta Hawks players
Basketball players from Pennsylvania
Cleveland Cavaliers draft picks
Cleveland Cavaliers players
Detroit Pistons players
Florida State Seminoles men's basketball players
Golden State Warriors players
Houston Rockets players
Point guards
Shooting guards
Sportspeople from Wilkes-Barre, Pennsylvania